Introducing the Howling Hex is an album by The Howling Hex.  It was released as an LP by Drag City in 2003.

Track listing
All songs written by the Howling Hex

Side one
"Centerville Springs"
"If You Can't Tell the Difference, Why Pay Less?"
"Slapshot!"

Side two
"Catalytic Convert"
"Be the Last to Stay in a Haunted House and You Will Inherit 50 Million $$"
"Fatter Than Anything"
"The Preserve, the Common"

References

2003 albums
Howling Hex albums
Drag City (record label) albums